
Grajewo County is a unit of territorial administration and local government (powiat) in Podlaskie Voivodeship, north-eastern Poland. It came into being on January 1, 1999, as a result of the Polish local government reforms passed in 1998.

As of 2019 its total population is 47,353, out of which the population of Grajewo is 21,909, that of Szczuczyn is 3,376, that of Rajgród is 1,573, and the rural population is 20,495.

Neighbouring counties
Grajewo County is bordered by Ełk County to the north, Augustów County to the east, Mońki County to the south-east, Łomża County to the south, Kolno County to the south-west and Pisz County to the west.

Administrative division
The county is subdivided into six gminas (one urban, two urban-rural and three rural). These are listed in the following table, in descending order of population.

References

 
Grajewo